Kamla Keswani ([Sindhi: ڪملا ڪيسواڻي], 27 August 1934 - 9 May 2009) was an Indian folk and playback singer. She was one of the popular Sindhi language singers of India.

Early life 
Kamla was born on 27 August 1934 in Karachi, Sindh, British India (Now Pakistan). Her parents belonged to Sukkur.  Her father Gobind Ram Madnani was a telephone operator. She received school education in Sukkur. She was only 13 years old when the British India was divided into India and Pakistan. Like other Hindu Sindhis, she migrated to India in 1947 and settled first in Jodhpur, then in Bikaner and finally in Jaipur India. She continued her education in Jaipur and received a Bachelor of Arts degree from Jaipur University. She was interested in music and singing since school age.

Singing career 
She began her singing career from All India Radio. She sang many marriage songs called Sahera or Lada, Sufi kalams and folk songs both in Sindhi and Rajasthani languages. Some of her popular songs were recorded by His Master's Voice Company and All India Radio. She also sang in marriage parties, social gatherings and musical programs all over India and abroad. She also used to perform on Indian TV channels. A number of albums of her songs were also relseased.

Famous musician C. Arjun introduced her in Sindhi Cinema as a playback singer. She performed as a playback singer in the following Sindhi language Indian films:

 Ho Jamalo (Sindhi: ھو جمالو)
 Shall Dheear Na Jaman (Sindhi: شال ڌيئر نہ ڄمن)
 Ladli (Sindhi: لاڏلي)

Death 
Kamla Keswani died on 9 May 2009 in Jaipur, India.

References 

1934 births
2009 deaths
20th-century Indian women singers
20th-century Indian singers
Indian women singers
Sindhi-language singers
Sindhi playback singers
 Indian women playback singers
 Indian women folk singers
Sindhi people